Muttpop is a producer of designer toys founded in 2005 by Robert Silva and Jerry Frissen specializing in artist-created toys. Muttpop is known for its Lucha Libre inspired toys.

Information
The Lucha Libre Designer Toy figure line includes various color variations of Tequila, El Panda, Red Demon, and Dr. Destruction. Muttpop is currently in development on the 5th figure from the Lucha Libre line: King Katch.

Although initially known for collaborating with Japan-based toy sculptor Monster5, Muttpop has also collaborated with SyteR (on Dr. Destruction) and the Sosa Brothers (on Oban Star Racer Molly and the Tcho by Ohm! mini-figure line).

References

Toy companies of the United States